Wilbert "Doug" Pearson Jr. is a retired major general and test pilot in the United States Air Force. On September 13, 1985, he conducted the test launch of an ASM-135 ASAT missile that destroyed the Solwind satellite. He later served as the director of operations for Air Force Materiel Command and as the commander of the Air Force Flight Test Center. Pearson retired from active duty on January 1, 2005.

Personal life

Pearson's son, Todd, was the commander of the 493rd Fighter Squadron at RAF Lakenheath. In 2007, Todd flew the F-15 Eagle that was used for the ASM-135 test launch in a commemorative flight.

Dates of promotion

References

Living people
United States Air Force generals
U.S. Air Force Test Pilot School alumni
Texas A&M University alumni
Year of birth missing (living people)